This is a list of players who have played at least one game for the California Golden Seals franchise of the National Hockey League (NHL). This list does not include players for the Cleveland Barons or the Minnesota North Stars and the Dallas Stars of the NHL.



Key
  Hockey Hall of Famer, or retired number.

The "Seasons" column lists the first year of the season of the player's first game and the last year of the season of the player's last game. For example, a player who played one game in the 2000–2001 season would be listed as playing with the team from 2000–2001, regardless of what calendar year the game occurred within.

Skaters

Goaltenders

See also

List of NHL players
List of Cleveland Barons players

References
California Seals all-time player roster at hockeydb.com

players